Abraham Bosse ( – 14 February 1676) was a French artist, mainly as a printmaker in etching, but also in watercolour.

Life

He was born to Huguenot (Calvinist) parents in Tours, France, where his father had moved from Germany. His father was a tailor, and Bosse's work always depicted clothes in loving detail. He married Catherine Sarrabat at Tours in 1632. He remained a Huguenot, dying before the Revocation of the Edict of Nantes, but was happy to illustrate religious subjects to Catholic taste.

Work
Roughly 1600 etchings are attributed to him, with subjects including: daily life, religion, literature, fashion, technology, and science. Most of his output was illustrations for books, but many were also sold separately.

His style grows from Dutch and Flemish art, but is given a strongly French flavour. Many of his images give informative detail about middle and upper-class daily life in the period, although they must be treated with care as historical evidence. His combination of very carefully depicted grand interiors with relatively trivial domestic subjects was original and highly influential on French art, and also abroad — William Hogarth's engravings are, among other things, a parody of the style. Most of his images are perhaps best regarded as illustrations rather than art.

He was apprenticed in Paris about 1620 to the Antwerp-born engraver Melchior Tavernier, who was also an important publisher. His first etchings date to 1622, and are influenced by Jacques Bellange. Following a meeting in Paris about 1630, he became a follower of Jacques Callot, whose technical innovations in etching he popularised in the famous and much translated Traité des manières de graver en taille-douce [Treatise on Line Engraving] (1645), the first to be published. He took Callot's highly detailed small images to a larger size, and a wider range of subject matter.

Unlike Callot, his declared aim, in which he largely succeeded, was to make etchings look like engravings, to which end he sacrificed willingly the freedom of the etched line, whilst certainly exploiting to the full the speed of the technique. Like most etchers, he frequently used engraving on a plate in addition to etching, but produced no pure engravings.

Controversy
In 1641, he began to attend classes given by the architect Girard Desargues (1591–1661) on perspective and other technical aspects of depiction. Bosse not only adopted these methods but also published a series of works between 1643–1653 explaining and promoting them.

In 1648, Cardinal Mazarin established the Académie Royale de Peinture et de Sculpture. Bosse was made an honorary member in 1651. However his publicising of Desargues' methods embroiled him in a controversy with Charles Le Brun and his followers, who had different methods, and also a belief that "genius" rather than technical method should be the guide in creating artworks. In 1661 Bosse was forced to withdraw from the Academy; he established his own school as an alternative, but it was suppressed by Le Brun.

Major works

Etchings & Images

 — fashion (partly after Jean de St-Igny)(1629)
 (ca. 1630) — street cries
 (1632)
 (1633) — bourgeois vs pastoral weddings
 (1635?) — The trades
 (1643), printed by P. de Hayes, Paris
 (1643)
 De la manière de graver à l'eaux-forte et au burin (1645)
 (1645) The "Manual of Etching".
 (1648) — Manual on perspective
 (1653)
 The famous frontispiece for Leviathan by Thomas Hobbes (1651) was created with input from Hobbes.
 (1664) — Architecture
 (1665)

Later Collections
 Die Kunst, in Kupfer zu stechen, Ilmer, Osnabrück 1975 (Repr. d. Ausg. Nürnberg 1765)
 Radier-Büchlein. Handelt von der Etzkunst, nemlich wie man mit Scheidwasser in Kupfer etzen, das Wasser und wie auch den harten und weichen Etzgrund machen solle, Moos, München 1977,  (Repr. d. Ausg. Nürnberg 1689)

Gallery

Notes

Bibliography
 Benezit (2006). "BOSSE, Abraham", vol. 2, pp. 922–923, in Benezit Dictionary of Artists. Paris: Gründ.
 Dhombres, Jean; Joël Sakharovitch, editors (1994). Desargues en son temps. Paris: Albert Blanchard. .
 Guerriaud, M. (2013), "Abraham Bosse et la gravure du doyen". Revue d’Histoire de la Pharmacie, vol. 378/379, .
 Harrison, Colin (1996). "Bosse, Abraham", vol. 4, pp. 467–469, in The Dictionary of Art, 34 volumes, edited by Jane Turner. New York: Grove. .
 Join-Lambert, S.; J.-P. Manceau (1995). Abraham Bosse, graveur et sçavant. CRDP de la région Centre.. 
 Join-Lambert, S.; Maxime Préaud, editors (2004). Abraham Bosse, savant graveur. BNF-Musée des Beaux-arts de Tours, diffusion éd. du Seuil. .
 Vuillemin, Jean-Claude (2008). “Abraham Bosse”, vol. 1, pp. 176–179, in Dictionary of Seventeenth-Century French Philosophers, edited by L. Foisneau, 2 vols. London and New York: Thoemmes Continuum. .

External links

Dossier on Abraham Bosse by the French ministry of culture. (in French)
 BNF exhibition feature, with many images & much text in French — click  for image galleries, then choose from menu on left
 Abraham Bosse (1645) Tracté des manieres de graver en taille douce sur l'airin - digital facsimile from the Linda Hall Library
Works by Abraham Bosse at the National Gallery of Art

1600s births
1676 deaths
Artists from Tours, France
17th-century French engravers
Huguenots